This is a list of episodes  of the Indian television sitcom Sarabhai vs Sarabhai. The show had 70 episodes in Season 1 and 10 episodes in Season 2.

Series overview

Episodes

Season 1 (2004–06)
All episodes have been directed by Deven Bhojani, who played the character of Dushyant on the show.

Season 2 (2017)
The new season returned in May 2017 on Hotstar as a web series. The season was titled Sarabhai vs Sarabhai: Take 2. The takes leap of seven years with the introduction of some new characters.

References

External links
 Sarabhai vs Sarabhai episodes on hotstar

Sarabhai vs Sarabhai

Lists of Indian television series episodes
Lists of sitcom episodes